The "Geryoneis" is a fragmentary poem, written in Ancient Greek by the lyric poet Stesichorus. Composed in the 6th century BC, it narrates an episode from the Heracles myth in which the hero steals the cattle of Geryon, a three-bodied monster with a human face.

Preservation
 
The text of the "Geryoneis" has only been handed down in fragmentary form. The majority of which comes from Papyrus Oxyrhynchus XXXII 2617, which was published in 1967. Additional fragments can be found in Book 11 of Athenaeus' Deipnosophistae. The extant parts of the poem exhibit numerous lacunae, with only fragment 19 (= 15 SLG) displaying long stretches of uninterrupted text. The length of the complete poem is estimated to 1300 lines.

Synopsis

The extant parts of the poem begin with the prelude of the fight between Heracles and Geryon. They include: a council of the gods, which resolves that Geryon is to die, the birth of his cowherd Eurytion and a depiction of his parents, trying to convince him not to face Heracles. The final moments of the conflict are preserved at length: Heracles shoots a deadly arrow into Geryon's forehead. His agony is described in detail and compared to a withering poppy.

Reception

Like much of Stesichorus' output, the "Geryoneis" has been noted for its use and advancement of Homeric elements. Especially the humanisation of Geryon through the mention of his parents and the poppy simile has been highlighted by critics.

Notes

References
Budelmann, F. (2018) Greek Lyric. A Selection (Cambridge, Cambridge University Press)
Davies, M. and Finglass, P. (2014) Stesichorus: The Poems (Cambridge, Cambridge University Press)
Kelly, A. (2015) 'Stesichorus' Homer' in P. Finglass and A. Kelly (eds.) Stesichorus in Context (Cambridge, Cambridge University Press)
West, M. (1993) Greek Lyric Poetry (Oxford, Oxford University Press)

Labours of Hercules
Ancient Greek poems
6th-century BC literature